Events from the year 1810 in France.

Incumbents
 Emperor – Napoleon I

Events
6 January - Treaty of Paris ends war between France and Sweden.
10 January - Marriage of Napoleon and Joséphine de Beauharnais is annulled.
4 March - French Army retreats from Portugal.
11 March - Napoleon marries Marie-Louise of Austria.
26 April - Peninsular War: Siege of Ciudad Rodrigo begins. Spanish garrison besieged by French forces.
9 July - Napoleon annexes the Kingdom of Holland.
9 July - Peninsular War: Siege of Ciudad Rodrigo ends in French victory.
24 July - Peninsular War: Battle of the Côa.
25 July - Peninsular War: Siege of Almeida begins. French lay siege to British and Portuguese forces.
20 August - Napoleonic Wars: Battle of Grand Port, Mauritius. French victory over British fleet.
21 August - One of Napoleon's marshals, Jean Baptiste Bernadotte, was elected crown prince of Sweden.
27 August - Peninsular War: Siege of Almeida ends with French victory.
27 September - Battle of Bussaco, Anglo-Portuguese victory over the French.
Peugeot engineering business established.
Dominique Larrey makes the first ambulances.

Births

January to June
21 January - Pierre Louis Charles de Failly, General (died 1892)
8 February - Eliphas Levi, occult author and magician (died 1875)
4 April - Désirée Gay, socialist feminist (d. c.1891)
8 April - Hégésippe Moreau, poet (died 1838)
13 April - Félicien-César David, composer (died 1876)
28 June - Célestin Joseph Félix, Jesuit (died 1891)

July to December
14 July - Aristide Boucicaut, creator of Le Bon Marché department stores (died 1877)
21 July - Henri Victor Regnault, chemist and physicist (died 1878)
4 August - Maurice de Guérin, poet (died 1839)
15 August - Louise Colet, poet (died 1876)
12 September - Ernest Courtot de Cissey, General (died 1882)
29 October - Sophie d'Arbouville, writer (died 1850)
8 November - Pierre Bosquet, Marshal of France (died 1861)
7 December — Theodor Schwann, German physiologist (died 1882)
11 December - Alfred de Musset, dramatist, poet and novelist (died 1857)

Full date unknown
Louise Rosalie Allan-Despreaux, actress (died 1856)
Louis Aubert-Roche, physician (died 1874)
Baron de César Bazancourt, military historian (died 1865)
Eugène Belgrand, engineer (died 1878)
Louis-Auguste Desmarres, ophthalmologist (died 1882)
François Edmond Eugène de Barlatier de Mas, naval officer
Pierre-Jules Mêne, sculptor (died 1879)
Antoine Léon Morel-Fatio, painter (died 1871)

Deaths

January to June
1 March - Jean-Jacques de Boissieu, painter (born 1736)
2 May - Jean-Louis Baudelocque, obstetrician (born 1745)
21 May - Chevalier d'Eon, diplomat, spy and soldier who lived the first half of her life as a man and the second half as a woman (born 1728)
29 May - François-Urbain Domergue, grammarian and journalist (born 1745)
26 June - Joseph-Michel Montgolfier, airship inventor (born 1740)

July to December
12 August - Étienne Louis Geoffroy, entomologist (born 1725)
13 August - Jacques-François Menou, General (born 1750)
19 October - Jean-Georges Noverre, dancer and balletmaster (born 1727)
23 October - Jean Baptiste Marie Franceschi-Delonne, General (born 1767)
26 October - Alexandre-Antoine Hureau de Sénarmont, Artillery General (born 1769)
1 December - Jean Baptiste Treilhard, politician (born 1742)
8 December - Ange-François Fariau, poet and translator (born 1747)

Full date unknown
Charles-Claude Flahaut de la Billaderie, comte d'Angiviller, director of the Bâtiments du Roi (born 1730)
François Cabarrus, adventurer (born 1752)
Esprit Calvet, physician and collector (born 1728)
Antoine-Denis Chaudet, sculptor (born 1763)
Jean-Marie Morel, architect and surveyor (born 1728)
François Péron, naturalist and explorer (born 1775)

See also

References

1810s in France